Sir Robert Henry Woods (27 April 1865 – 8 September 1938) was an Irish surgeon and otorhinolaryngologist and also an Independent Unionist Member of Parliament (MP) in the United Kingdom Parliament.

Personal life
He was born at Tullamore, King's County (now County Offaly), the son of Christopher Woods and Dorothea Lowe. 

He attended Wesley College, Dublin and Trinity College Dublin as well as studying in Vienna, before graduating in medicine in 1889. 

In August 1894, he married Margaret Shaw, daughter of county court judge James Johnston Shaw; they raised five children. 

He became President of the Royal College of Surgeons in Ireland 1910–11. He was Professor of Laryngology and Otology at Trinity College. He was knighted in 1913.

Political career

He was MP for Dublin University between 1918 and 1922, having previously been defeated in a 1917 by-election for the same constituency. 

Woods left the House of Commons at the dissolution of 1922 when his constituency ceased to be represented in the House of Commons.

Death
Robert Henry Woods died in Ballybrack, Dublin on 8 September 1938, aged 73.

References

 Who's Who of British Members of Parliament, Vol. III 1919-1945, edited by M. Stenton & S. Lees (The Harvester Press 1979)

External links

 
 

1865 births
1938 deaths
Alumni of Trinity College Dublin
Independent members of the House of Commons of the United Kingdom
Irish knights
Members of the Parliament of the United Kingdom for Dublin University
UK MPs 1918–1922
Politicians from County Offaly
Academics of Trinity College Dublin
Teachtaí Dála for Dublin University
People from Tullamore, County Offaly
Irish surgeons
Otolaryngologists
People educated at Wesley College, Dublin
People from Howth